Lani Loa – The Passage is a 1998 film directed by Sherwood Hu, executive produced by Francis Ford Coppola, about a woman murdered on her wedding day in Hawaii who comes back to haunt her murderers. The film stars Angus Macfadyen, Ray Bumatai, Carlotta Chang and Chris Tashima.  It was the first film from Coppola's and Wayne Wang's Chrome Dragon Films, a short-lived film company that was to specialize in utilizing Asian talent on American-financed projects.  Set in Hawaii, the film was shot in Hilo, Hawaii and in China, in Hainan and Shanghai.

It screened at the San Sebastian Film Festival and the Hawaii International Film Festival (as Lani Loa: The Heavenly Passage) and has been released in Asia on VCD, as Lani-Loa (Hawaiian Ghost Story).

Cast
(Main players)
Angus Macfadyen as Turner
Ray Bumatai as Hawaiian Kenny
Carlotta Chang as Jenny
Chris Tashima as Bong
Leonelle Akana as Auntie Wana

See also
List of ghost films

External links
 

1998 films
1998 crime films
Films about Chinese Americans
American ghost films
Films set in Hawaii
Films shot in China
Films shot in Hawaii
Films produced by Francis Ford Coppola
1990s English-language films
1990s American films